Santiago Vega may refer to:
 Santiago Vega, known as Washington Cucurto, Argentinian writer
 Santiago Vega (footballer), Uruguayan footballer
 Santiago Vega (skier), Chilean Paralympic skier, see Alpine skiing at the 2014 Winter Paralympics – Men's slalom